Sugarloaf Mountain is a mountain in Sullivan County, New York. It is located northeast of Grahamsville. Denman Mountain is located west-northwest, Kalonymus Escarpment is located south-southeast, and South Hill is located south-southwest of Sugarloaf Mountain.

References

Mountains of Sullivan County, New York
Mountains of New York (state)